Hasan Abdullah Ismaik is a Jordanian businessman and Chairman of Hasan Abdullah Mohammed Group (HAMG Group), a UAE-based group of investment companies founded by Ismaik in 2006. He owns Marya Development & Real Estate Investment LLC, a private investment company in the United Arab Emirates with a diversified investment portfolio that includes projects worth US$4 billion. He is the chairman and majority shareholder of the German sports club TSV 1860 Munich; Chairman of Al-Ashmal Real-Estate Investment Co. in Jordan; and Chairman of publicly listed Masaken for Land and Industrial Development Projects (Masaken Capital). In 2014, Forbes Magazine listed Ismaik as the first Jordanian billionaire and the third-youngest billionaire in the Middle East.

Ismaik had his name in the media when the shares in Depa had risen steadily over one year, increasing from about 40 fils in August 2013 to a high of 71 fils in June 2013 that was the day before he resigned from his position as the chairman of Depa, leaving the Nasdaq Dubai-quoted firm, Arabtec without a chairman. However, the company drastically scaled back its plans after Mr Ismaik abruptly resigned, sending shares into a freefall and leaving question marks hanging over non-core business of Ismaik.

Furthermore, in March 2016 thereby  were rumours that Hasan Ismaik, will be appointed to the board of Arabtec again, however "the rumours over the appointment of Mr Hasan Ismaik as Chairman or member of the board of directors of Arabtec are false and are not based on any true facts or events," Arabtec said in a bourse filing.

Early life and education 
Ismaik was born in Kuwait in 1977 and holds a BA in Business Administration from Al-Mustansiriyah University in Baghdad.

Ismaik launched his career as a real estate entrepreneur in Jordan, Saudi Arabia and the United Arab Emirates, with a specific interest in the oil and gas sectors. Following the introduction of the freehold property law that sparked the real estate boom in Dubai, he transferred his business focus to the UAE market where he continued to gain commercial achievements.

Investments
He pushed plans to diversify his investment portfolio and explored new investment and asset acquisition opportunities in industries as diverse as energy, real estate, construction, transportation, retail and architectural design services. In 2006, Ismaik founded HAMG Group, an Abu Dhabi-based group of investment companies. In addition to HAMG, Ismaik has commercial interest in a wide range of industries including real estate, retail, and architectural design services, among others, across the United Arab Emirates, GCC and the Middle East.

HAMG Group includes the following subsidiary companies:

Marya Investments: A UAE-based private investment company that has interest in a wide range of industries spanning real estate, healthcare, education and general investments. Its flagship projects include Shams One in Dubai Marina and MARYA Down Town – Dubai; the latter comprises four central landmark towers overlooking the marina and the Burj Khalifa, along with a range of residential and serviced apartments.
Studio International Interior Design LLC: A UAE-based design consultancy for interior design, architecture, transport and product design, landscape design, structural engineering, lighting design, MEP service design, brand development and graphics.
First Capital Group Holding Limited: First Capital is a general investment company based out of Dubai International Financial Center "DIFC".
Al Manara International Jewellery: Successfully Exited, one of the retailers of watches and jewellery in the United Arab Emirates. Established in 1973, Al Manara International Jewellery was acquired by HAMG in partnership with Ahmed Seddiqi & Sons. It boasts the largest portfolio of finest Swiss watch and jewellery brands across a network of fourteen luxury boutiques in Abu Dhabi and Al Ain. Having built a reputation as one of Abu Dhabi's premier retailers of luxury watches and jewellery, Al Manara operates a broad range of renowned brands including Patek Philippe, Breitling, Chopard, Audemars Piguet, Piaget, Dior, Baume & Mercier, Hublot, and Tag Heuer.
TSV 1860 Munich Ismaik bought 60 percent of the TSV 1860 Munich, a German sports club owned by the UAE-based private investment company HAMG. The club was established on 17 May 1860 following a merger with a number of local clubs.
Arabtec Holdings: In 2013, Ismaik was appointed as CEO of Arabtec Holdings, the largest construction company in the GCC, which had a total market capitalization of nearly US$6.82 billion at that time. He served as the managing director and CEO of Arabtec Holdings and Chairman of Arabtec Constructions. In June 2014, Ismaik became the single largest investor in Arabtec Holdings after increasing his personal shareholding in the company to 28.84 percent, putting his net worth at AED 8 billion in shares at that time. Under his leadership, Arabtec Holdings embarked on a new strategy toward incremental growth. He spearheaded the overhauling of the construction company's business, driving growth by targeting new sectors. This led to the consolidation and consequent strengthening of the firm's operations, via acquisitions, joint ventures and strategic alliances across oil, gas, energy and infrastructure sectors in the Middle East and North Africa. During his tenure at Arabtec, Ismaik formed a joint venture with South Korea’s Samsung Engineering, and signed a similar agreement with GS Engineering & Construction, one of the largest multi-faceted companies in South Korea to undertake heavy civil infrastructure work in the Middle East and North Africa. 

He signed an MOU with the Egyptian armed forces to build one million houses in Egypt. The project, one of the biggest in the region, aimed to provide housing for lower income individuals. In June 2013, the Board of Directors of Depa Limited, one of the world's leading interior contracting companies, appointed Ismaik as its new chairman. His appointment followed a strong performance by the company across its diverse and robust project catalogue in the first quarter of the year, when the company's revenue increased by 18 percent to AED446 million.

Masaken Capital: Ismaik is the Chairman of publicly listed Masaken for Land and Industrial Development Projects (Masaken Capital), an Amman-based real estate firm founded in 2008. He acquired 37 percent of the company's capital in August 2015. Deemed one of the largest investments in the Jordanian stock market, the acquisition was tasked with supporting the Jordanian economy through promoting investments and providing job opportunities for the Jordanian workforce, in line with the vision and directives of His Majesty King Abdullah II. 
The company's key investments in Jordan include the Al-Haytham commercial complex, Masaken Academy, in addition to land ownership in various regions throughout the kingdom.

Acquisition of shares of TSV 1860 Munich
In June 2011, Ismaik bought 60 percent, an investment of €18 million ($25.8 million) of TSV 1860 Munich, a German sports club based in Munich that plays in the 3. Liga. Becoming the first Arab to acquire shares of a German football club, Ismaik claimed that his aim was to safeguard the survival of the club that was one of the founding members of the German national Bundesliga. Due to DFL regulations, Ismaik only has 49 percent of the voting rights; the additional shares are without voting rights.

Ismaik commented on the acquisition:

The acquisition was followed by a long and controversial discussion about Ismaik's goals and intentions regarding this investment, which is still ongoing (Status as of December 2016).

Since the acquisition of the shares, neither the financial situation nor the sporting success of TSV 1860 Munich have improved significantly.

At the end of the 2016–17 season, TSV 1860 Munich were relegated to the third tier of German football following a play-off defeat against Jahn Regensburg. Unable to resolve his differences with club officials regarding his control of the club, Ismaik refused to provide the approximately ten million euros necessary for a 3.Liga playing license and the club was subsequently automatically relegated even further to the regional fourth tier. Ismaik remains in control.

Awards and recognitions
 Forbes Magazine listed Ismaik as the first Jordanian billionaire and the third-youngest billionaire in the Middle East in 2014.
 Ismaik was awarded first place in Construction Week's Power 100 in 2013. The list features individuals who influence and guide the GCC's construction industry.
 In 2014, MEED business intelligence magazine listed him as one of the 12 most influential personalities on the Middle East economic scene.

References

Living people
Leaders of organizations
Jordanian businesspeople
1977 births